The HXN5B, is a diesel-electric locomotive used by China Railway in the People's Republic of China. It has been in production since 2012. It is a new-generation road switcher type made in China and used for yard and road switching services.

China Railway Corporation also ordered the new design of the HXN5B with variable gauge. The HXN5B-2001 with the new design was built in 2017, like the DF7C and DF7G, it was fitted with a regauging device to allow operation on Russian gauge lines. The locomotive was passed the technical review of China Railway Corporation in April 2018.

Main users 
The HXN5B is used by China Railway Corporation:
 Ürümqi Railway Bureau
 Chengdu Railway Bureau
 Nanning Railway Bureau
 Guangzhou Railway Group
 Kunming Railway Bureau
 Xi'an Railway Bureau
 Lanzhou Railway Bureau
 Nanchang Railway Bureau
 Shanghai Railway Bureau
 Taiyuan Railway Bureau

Gallery

See also 
 List of locomotives in China
 China Railways HXN5

References

External links 
 HXN5B high power AC transmission shunting locomotives, CRRC QISHUYAN CO.,LTD. (English)
 HXN5B high power AC transmission shunting locomotives, CRRC QISHUYAN CO.,LTD. (Chinese)

Diesel-electric locomotives of China
Co-Co locomotives
Railway locomotives introduced in 2012
Standard gauge locomotives of China
Qishuyan locomotives